Poor Moon is the first full-length album released on August 28, 2012 by Seattle based band Poor Moon, and their second release on US label Sub Pop.

A review in Pitchfork magazine called the band "a who's who of acts regional and national".

Track listing

References

External links
Album on Sub Pop
Artist on Sub Pop

2012 debut albums
Poor Moon albums
Sub Pop albums